Kindle Lee Vildor (born December 11, 1997) is an American football cornerback for the Chicago Bears of the National Football League (NFL). He played college football at Georgia Southern and was drafted by the Bears in the fifth round of the 2020 NFL Draft.

Early life and high school
Vildor was born in the DeKalb County, Georgia section of Atlanta and grew up in College Park, Georgia. He attended North Clayton High School. A 2-star cornerback recruit, he committed to Georgia Southern over offers from Troy, Tulane, Western Kentucky, and Wyoming, among others.

College career
Vildor started the final three seasons of his collegiate career. He had 42 tackles, 4.5 tackles for a loss and also lead the team with 11 passes broken up and four interceptions and was named first-team All-Sun Belt Conference in his junior season. Vildor was named first-team All-Sun Belt for a second straight season and a Pro Football Focus All-American as a senior after recording 27 tackles, two interceptions and six passes broken up.

Professional career

Vildor was selected by the Chicago Bears with the 163rd pick in the fifth round of the 2020 NFL Draft. He signed a four-year rookie contract with the team on July 21. Vildor mostly played on special teams during the 2020 season. In the Bears' Week 15 game against the Jacksonville Jaguars, Vildor made his first NFL start at corner back. In 2020, Vildor played in all 16 games while starting in 1 and had 17 combined tackles and 1 pass defended. In the Bears' Week 11 game against the Baltimore Ravens, Vildor got his first career sack on Ravens quarterback Tyler Huntley. Overall in 2021, Vildor played in 17 games starting in 12 of them with 46 combined tackles, a sack, and 4 passes defended.

Vildor entered the 2022 season as a starting cornerback alongside Jaylon Johnson and Kyler Gordon. In a Week 5 game against the Minnesota Vikings, he got his first career interception off of Kirk Cousins. He finished the season with 34 tackles, five passes defensed and one interception through 11 games and nine starts.

References

External links
Georgia Southern Eagles bio

1997 births
Living people
Players of American football from Georgia (U.S. state)
Sportspeople from College Park, Georgia
American football cornerbacks
Georgia Southern Eagles football players
Chicago Bears players